Dundas Aqueduct carries the Kennet and Avon Canal over the River Avon (the Somerset / Wiltshire border) and the Wessex Main Line railway from Bath to Westbury.

It was designed by John Rennie and chief engineer John Thomas between 1797 and 1801, and completed in 1805. James McIlquham was appointed contractor. It is named after Charles Dundas, the first chairman of the Kennet and Avon Canal Company. The central semi-circular arch spans ; the two oval side arches span .

The canal crosses back across the Avon and the railway on another aqueduct at Avoncliff. This diversion onto the right bank of the Avon avoids the steep sides of the river valley at Limpley Stoke, and the need to cross the Midford Brook and River Frome.

It is a Grade I listed building, and was the first canal structure to be designated as a Scheduled Ancient Monument in 1951.

Over many years, leaks had developed and the aqueduct was closed in 1954. For a while in the 1960s and 1970s, the canal was dry and it was possible to walk along the bed on each side of the river, as well as through the aqueduct itself. The aqueduct was relined with polythene and concrete and restored, reopening in 1984. Care was taken not to disturb a colony of bats living under the aqueduct.

The aqueduct is also the junction between the Kennet and Avon Canal and the largely derelict Somerset Coal Canal. The short stretch of the Somerset Coal Canal still in water forms Brassknocker Basin, used for boat moorings, cycle hire and a cafe, and is next to Dundas Wharf where the small tollhouse, warehouse and crane still stand. The stretch of river below and above the aqueduct is used by Monkton Combe School Boat Club (Monkton Bluefriars) up to six days a week, since at least the 1960s. At the opposite (Wiltshire) end of the aqueduct a wharf was constructed serving the Conkwell stone quarries.

Between 2002 and 2004 further restoration was undertaken, which included replacing engineering bricks used by GWR with Bath Stone to match the original work.

In 2015, the railway below the aqueduct was lowered to allow the route to be used as a diversionary route for freight trains in the future. Network Rail published a time-lapse video of the work.

See also

Avoncliff Aqueduct
Locks on the Kennet and Avon Canal
List of canal aqueducts in Great Britain

References

Kennet and Avon Canal
Canals in Somerset
Canals in Wiltshire
Georgian architecture in Wiltshire
Grade I listed bridges
Grade I listed buildings in Wiltshire
Bridges completed in 1805
Scheduled monuments in Wiltshire
Grade I listed buildings in Bath and North East Somerset
Navigable aqueducts in England
Grade I listed canals
1805 establishments in England
Bridges across the River Avon, Bristol